The Journal of Postgraduate Medicine is a multidisciplinary quarterly biomedical journal. The journal is the official publication of the Staff Society of Seth Gordhandas Sunderdas Medical College and King Edward Memorial Hospital, Mumbai, India. 

The journal was established in 1955 with N.M. Purandare as its first editor-in-chief. It is published open access.

Abstracting and Indexing 
The journal is indexed and abstracted in Index Medicus, Current Contents, Science Citation Index, EMBASE, CAB Abstracts, and AMED.

External links 
 
 History of the journal
 The journal's Golden Jubilee Celebration

Open access journals
Quarterly journals
English-language journals
Medknow Publications academic journals
Publications established in 1955
General medical journals
Academic journals associated with universities and colleges
1955 establishments in Bombay State